At the Black Hawk 5 is a live album by drummer Shelly Manne's group Shelly Manne & His Men, recorded at the Black Hawk in San Francisco, California, in 1959 and released on the Contemporary label in 1991. The album followed four volumes originally released in 1960 and features unreleased recordings from the Black Hawk sessions.

Reception

The AllMusic review by Scott Yanow states: "the final CD of the extensive documentation of the Shelly Manne Quintet's stint at the Black Hawk club consists entirely of previously unreleased material. The performances by trumpeter Joe Gordon, tenor saxophonist Richie Kamuca, pianist Russ Freeman , bassist Monty Budwig, and the drummer/leader are the same high level as on the more familiar material".

Track listing
 "How Deep Are the Roots" (Horace Silver) - 11:12
 "This Is Always" (Mack Gordon, Harry Warren) - 10:13
 "Wonder Why" (Nicholas Brodszky, Sammy Cahn) - 8:56
 "Eclipse of Spain" (Victor Feldman) - 10:41
 "Pullin' Strings" (Feldman) - 4:43
 "Theme: A Gem from Tiffany" (Bill Holman) - 5:48 
Recorded at the Black Hawk, San Francisco on September 23 (tracks 1-3) and September 24 (tracks 5 & 6), 1959.

Personnel
Shelly Manne - drums
Joe Gordon - trumpet
Richie Kamuca - tenor saxophone
Victor Feldman - piano
Monty Budwig - bass

References

1991 live albums
Contemporary Records live albums
Shelly Manne live albums
Albums recorded at the Black Hawk (nightclub)